Lagkadas is a town and municipality in the northeast part of Thessaloniki regional unit, Greece. There are 41103 residents in the municipality and 7764 of them live in the town of Lagkadas.
Lagkadas is located northeast of Thessaloniki, at a distance of about 20 km from its center and at an altitude of about 130m, in the center of the valley of Mygdonia, through which Alexander the Great passed at his campaigns and also the Apostle Paul towards Thessaloniki and Athens. The climate is continental. Nearby is Lake Koroneia (or Lake Lagkada). The inhabitants of Lagkadas participated in the revolution of 1821, with the most famous fighter being Stavros Tzanis, who took part in many battles in southern Greece. The consequence was the destruction of the town in retaliation. During the Macedonian Struggle, the people of Lagkadas offered a lot, with the main Macedonian warrior, the chief Christos Dremlis.

Municipality
The municipality of Lagkadas was formed at the 2011 local government reform by the merger of the following 7 former municipalities, that became municipal units:
Assiros
Kallindoia
Koroneia
Lachanas
Lagkadas
Sochos
Vertiskos

The municipality of Langadas has an area of 1,222.65 km2, the municipal unit Lagkadas has an area of 197.411 km2, and the community Lagkadas has an area of 31.761 km2. Lagkadas is well known for the famous thermal spa

Climate

Lagkadas has a continental climate with significant temperature variations between winter and summer. On the 3rd of August 2021 the official meteorological station of the National Observatory of Athens in Lagkadas registered 47.1°C.

Population

The historical evolution of the population of Langadas town is as follows:

Notable natives

 Stavros Tzanis, fighter of the Revolution of 1821

Zübeyde Hanım (1857–1923), Mustafa Kemal Atatürk's mother

 Christos Dremlis, Macedonian warlord

Antonis Remos, singer

 Ιlias Klonaridis, singer

Transport
North of Lagkadas passes the Egnatia Odos (junction 24) connecting it with Thessaloniki. Lagkadas is connected to Thessaloniki by line 83 of OASTH (public buses).

References

Municipalities of Central Macedonia
Populated places in Thessaloniki (regional unit)